Wang Wusheng (1945 – 7 April 2018) was a Chinese photographer known for his black-and-white photographs of Mount Huangshan.

Biography
Wang Wusheng was born 1945 in Wuhu. Anhui, China and graduated from the Department of Physics of Anhui University.

Beginning in 1973, Wang worked as a photographer for a news magazine in Anhui Province, Anhui Newsphoto and Pictorial. In 1974, he started shooting Mounts Huangshan in Anhui.

In 1981 he moved to Japan. He became a research member at the Japan Foundation in 1983. He studied at the Art Institute of Nihon University in Japan as he won grant from the Japan Foundation’s endowment for Japanese art studies. Beginning in 1986, he studied for three years at the Tokyo Arts University.

In 1990, he moved to the U.S, spent a year in New York City and in the 90s his career blossomed at last. In 1998, Wang Wusheng held a solo exhibition titled "Himmelsberge" at the Kunsthistorisches Museum in Vienna. It was the first exhibition of photography and the first solo exhibition for a living artist at the museum. Then in 2005, the Permanent Missions of China and Japan to the United Nations presented Spirit of the East a two-person exhibition of Wang Wusheng’s photographs along with paintings by the late Japanese master artist Kaii Higashiyama, in the United Nations General Assembly’s Visitor’s Lobby. This exhibition was held in commemoration of the 60th anniversary of the United Nations.

Wang's photographs are represented in numerous public and private collections, including those of the Friedrich Christian Flick Collection in Berlin, the Kunsthistorisches Museum in Vienna, National Art Museum of China in Beijing, Shanghai Art Museum, Tokyo Metropolitan Museum of Photography, Robert Klein Gallery in Boston, Kunsthalle Krems in Austria, in Russia, United States, and Ukraine.

Wang died in Shanghai on 7 April 2018, at the age of 73.

Group exhibitions
 1997 : The Gravity of the Mountains: Mountains and Inner Worlds from the Romantics to the Present at Kunsthalle Krems, Austria
 2001 : The Photo Exhibition of National Treasure Ganjinwajo at the Tokyo Metropolitan Museum of Photography, Japan 
 2003 : Ganjinwajo: The Fine Art Photography Exhibition of 10 International Masters at the Shanghai Library, Shanghai, China
 2008 : Yellow Mountain: China's Ever-Changing Landscape, (showed the Chinese landscape paintings of the 17th century and the 18th century, and the photography of Wang Wusheng), at The Arthur M. Sackler Gallery, Washington, D.C. USA
 2012 : Contemporary Chinese Photography Rising Dragon, at the Krannert Art Museum, Illinois, USA 
 2012 : Contemporary Chinese Photography Rising Dragon, at Katonah Museum of Art, New York, USA 
 2013 : Contemporary Chinese Photography Rising Dragon, at The San Jose Museum of Art, San Jose, USA 
 2015 : Chinese Photography : Twentieth Century and Beyond, at Three Shadows Photography Art Centre, Beijing, China
 2016 : Celestian Realm, Mt. Huangshang at La Galerie, Hong-Kong

Solo exhibitions
 2014 : Celestial Realm at Brucie Collections Gallery, Kyiv, Ukraine  
 2013 : Celestial Realm at Barry Friedman, Ltd. New York, USA    
 2010 : Hometown at Shanghai Mart, Shanghai, China  
 2008 : Yellow Mountains at Robert Klein Gallery, Boston, USA  
 2006 : Spirit of the East (with Kaii Higashiyama), Higashiyama Kaii Memorial Hall, Ichikawa, Japan  
 2005 : Spirit of the East (with Kaii Higashiyama), United Nations, New York, USA  
 2002 : Mount Huangshan, Gallery epSITE, Tokyo, Japan 
 2000 : Celestial Mountains at the Tokyo Metropolitan Museum of Photography, Tokyo, Japan  
 1998 : Himmelsberge, at the Kunsthistorisches Museum, Vienna, Austria  
 1996 : Verve of Mt. Huangshan at Asakura Gallery, Tokyo, Japan  
 1995 : Verve of Mt. Huangshan at Shanghai Art Museum, Shanghai, China 
 1994 : Verve of Mt. Huangshan at Galleria Prova, Tokyo; Oxy Gallery, Osaka; Isetan Art Hall, Niigata; Iwataya Art Gallery, Fukuoka; National Art Museum of China, Beijing  
 1993 : Verve of Mt. Huangshan, at Mitsukoshi Main Store Gallery, Tokyo, Japan 
 1988 : Visions of the Tranquility of Mount Huangshan, at Seibu Museum of Art, Tokyo, Japan

Publications
 1981 : Mt. Huangshan: Works of Wang Wusheng, People's Fine Arts Publishing House, Beijing, China   
 1988 : Visions of the Tranquility of Mount Huangshan, Kodansha Ltd. Publisher, Tokyo, Japan 2011 
 1993 : Verve of Mt. Huangshan, Kodansha Ltd. Publisher, Tokyo, Japan, Hometown, Anhui, China  
 1994 : Artistic Interpretation of the Huangshan Mountain, Kodansha Ltd. Publisher, Tokyo, Japon & China Youth Publishing House, Beijing, China
 1998 : Himmelsberge Catalog, Kunsthistorisches Museum in Vienna, Austria & Skira Editore Publisher,  Milan, Italy  
 2000 : Celestial Mountains Catalog, Japan-China Association, Tokyo, Japon  
 2005 : Celestial Realm: The Yellow Mountains of China, Abbeville Press Publisher, New York, USA/London, UK   
 2006 : Huangshan, Montagnes Célestes, Imprimerie Nationale Publisher, Paris, France

See also
Lang Jingshan

References

1945 births
2018 deaths
Artists from Anhui
Chinese photographers
People from Wuhu
Chinese expatriates in Japan
Chinese expatriates in the United States